Rubén López Huesca (born 24 June 1995), commonly known as Rubio, is a Spanish professional footballer who plays for Spanish club Alcoyano as a forward.

Club career
On 5 June 2019, he joined Polish club Cracovia.

On 5 October 2020, he was loaned to Sandecja Nowy Sącz.

Honours

Club
Cracovia
Polish Cup: 2019–20

Personal life
His older brother Carlitos is also a footballer.

References

External links

1995 births
Living people
Footballers from Alicante
Spanish footballers
Association football forwards
Segunda División B players
Tercera División players
Ekstraklasa players
I liga players
III liga players
Elche CF Ilicitano footballers
CE L'Hospitalet players
CD Alcoyano footballers
MKS Cracovia (football) players
Zagłębie Sosnowiec players
Sandecja Nowy Sącz players
Spanish expatriate footballers
Spanish expatriate sportspeople in Poland
Expatriate footballers in Poland